Ernest Walter Hucker (1887-1970) was an Australian rugby league player who played in the 1910s.

Background
Hucker was born at Waterloo, New South Wales in 1887, and like many other young guys of the era, grew up playing rugby union.

Playing career
Hucker switched to the new code of rugby league at the inception of the South Sydney Rabbitohs in 1908, and was playing first grade for the club by 1910, and he played prop in the 1910 Final. He switched clubs to North Sydney in 1911, then switched back to South Sydney Rabbitohs for 1912 and for his final season he switched clubs again, this time to the Balmain club for 1913.

His only representative appearance was for the Sydney (Metropolis) team in 1911.

Hucker died on 3 July 1970 aged 83.

References

1887 births
1970 deaths
Australian rugby league players
South Sydney Rabbitohs players
Balmain Tigers players
North Sydney Bears players
Rugby league players from Sydney